Opportunities for a Better Tomorrow (OBT) is a non-profit with locations in Brooklyn and Queens in New York City. OBT's mission is to break the cycle of poverty and inequity through education, job training, and employment. The vision to strengthen the workforce by serving as a bridge to economic opportunity for youth, individuals, and families in underserved communities is critical for economic recovery during these unprecedented times.  In 2013, OBT partnered with the YMCA of Greater New York in the creation of Y Roads Centers. In 2014, OBT was named to the S&I's list of the 100 most effective organizations by the Social Impact Exchange.

History
Opportunities for a Better Tomorrow was founded in 1983 by Sister Mary Franciscus, RSM, to provide job training to the at-risk youth of Sunset Park, Brooklyn. OBT began in a rundown storefront with the support of a small government contract. By 1992, additional public and private support allowed the organization to move into a larger building in the same vicinity. At this time, OBT launched a job training program for adults and started a support program for graduates. Eventually, daytime and evening remedial education programs were also added. In 2001, the organization expanded its youth program by opening a second location, OBT North, in the Bushwick/Bedford–Stuyvesant sections of Brooklyn. In 2002, OBT won a PEPnet Builder award "for their commitment to continuous improvement" in working with youth. In 2006, after the untimely passing of Sr. Mary, OBT hired Randolph Peers, formerly Vice President of the Brooklyn Chamber of Commerce, as the new chief executive officer. In 2013 Opportunities for a Better Tomorrow partnered with the YMCA of Greater New York to open Y Roads centers across New York City. The first Y Roads center opened in Jamaica, Queens, in 2013 to provide the disconnected youth in the Jamaica community with education, job training, and support services.
 A second Y Roads center opened in Mott Haven, Bronx in October 2014.  In July 2015, Opportunities for a Better Tomorrow intends to officially merge with the Maura Clarke-Ita Ford Center (MCIF), which has been operating out of OBT's Bushwick Workforce Resource Center (BWRC) since September 2014.

Alongside the heightened awareness of racial violence and social injustice, in the Summer of 2020 OBT relaunched it Diversity, Equity & Inclusion Committee. The committee's mission is to develop strategies and best practices that deepen and build a culture where differences are valued. The committee aims to ensure OBT is a workplace that reflects the community we serve and encourages everyone to bring their full self. With help from employees, participants, partners, funders, and the community, we will ensure an inclusive culture that encourages, supports, and celebrates the diverse voices of all.

In 2021 the Board of Directors appointed Dr. Darlene Williams https://www.linkedin.com/in/drdarlenewilliams/ as the President and chief executive officer and entered a new chapter in the organization. She is actively enhancing OBT's visibility, strategic direction, and outward position in NYC as a leader during this critical period of economic recovery and workforce stability for opportunity youth and immigrants in our most vulnerable and marginalized communities. Her vision builds on the existing foundation and includes continuing to enhance and broaden the existing mission and vision of OBT's profound history.  The pillars of Dr. Williams’ strategic vision includes:

 Partnerships: Cultivating strategic partnerships/collaborations to enhance our existing programs and develop innovative projects
 Digital Transformation: Leading from the front and taking our digital transformation strategy to the next level by embracing platforms and positioning OBT as an expert for skills-based training, industry specific certifications, and employment
 Capacity Building: Strengthening our capacity, building our infrastructure, and strategically investing in the development of our teams through a blend of intentional skills building, sound management, strong governance, and dedication to assessing and achieving results.
 Diversity, Equity, and Inclusion: Incorporating an outward commitment to diversity, equity, and inclusion to elevate OBT's voice with an intentional focus on ensuring that our infrastructure is inclusive of the communities we serve, partnership with other organizations who share our principles, and that we remain current related to DE&I priorities.

Under Dr. Williams' leadership, OBT created its first Racial Equity and Inclusion Mission Statement:

 OBT's commitment to fostering and maintaining a work environment where diversity, equity, and inclusion are woven into our organizational DNA.  We recognize that structural racism, discrimination, systems of power, and other forms of oppression, give privilege and access to resources, lead to inequities, and have contributed to persistent disparities.  OBT is on an intentional journey to champion and operationalize the values of racial equity, diversity, and inclusion into our organization and the communities we serve. We strive to sustain a culture where all individuals can thrive and feel a sense of belonging, especially those whose voices and experiences have been historically marginalized. We commit our work to breaking oppressive barriers and serving as a bridge to sustainable economic opportunities that will build and strengthen an equitable workforce.

Services

Youth Education and Job Training
OBT's service model is unique among youth programs due to its comprehensive scope of training and its emphasis on personal discipline. The youth training model is an intensive 20-week program that includes high school equivalency classes (if needed), business math, business English, office procedures, computer classes (MS Office), public speaking and communications, and a world-of-work module. A simulated real work environment is an integral part of the entire curriculum. Participants are required to punch in and out on a time clock each day, dress professionally, and are given work assignments with timelines for completion. Excessive lateness and absenteeism result in the participants being “terminated” from the program. Students that successfully complete the 20-weeks emerge with a high school equivalency diploma and the skills necessary to obtain and retain employment. Most of OBT's job placements are clerical and administrative office related positions in financial services firms, law firms, government, and other related businesses. OBT's overall job placement percentage averages about 72% annually. One fifth of OBT's graduates also go on to enroll in college. The Youth Education and Job Training program is available at OBT's locations in Sunset Park and Williamsburg/Bushwick in Brooklyn; Jamaica, Queens; and Mott Haven, Bronx

Young Adult Internship Program
The Young Adult Internship Program is a 14-week job training and internship program available to young adults, ages 17 – 24, who live in New York City with preference given to those who live in the neighborhoods of Williamsburg, Bedford–Stuyvesant, Crown Heights, and Bushwick in Brooklyn and in Jamaica, Queens. The interns participate in five weeks of intensive business skills training followed an eleven-week paid internship. OBT's internship sites include: the Brooklyn Chamber of Commerce, New York State and New York City government offices, Weeksville Heritage Center, Brooklyn Navy Yard, Vernon Avenue Children's School, and Woodhull Medical Center.

Medical Administrative Assistant
The Medical Administrative Assistant Training Program provides youth, ages 17–21, with experience and training to have a successful career in the medical field. Participants receive training in medical terminology, communications, customer service and basic bookkeeping. Participants also receive a Medical Administrative Assistant Certification through the National Healthcareer Association and an internship in a hospital or doctor's office.

Anchoring Achievement in Mexican Communities
In 2013, OBT started an initiative specifically targeting youth in the Mexican community in Bushwick, Brooklyn to help improve retention in high school and help Mexican youth continue on to college.  In partnership with Churches United for Fair Housing, and Academy of Urban Planning (AUP). OBT runs the Growing Responsibly through Ownership and Willingness (GROW) program at St. Joseph Patron church, and the Anchor Up program at AUP. Each program meets once a week, in an effort to increase personal and professional development in its participants through career and college exploration and recreational activities including soccer, music, and art (at GROW).

Leading to Success
In 2014, as part of the Cure Violence initiative by the New York City Mayor's Office and Councilman Jumaane Williams, who is a co-chair of the New York City Council's Task Force to Combat Gun Violence, Opportunities for a Better Tomorrow launched their Leading to Success Program in conjunction with other community groups including Gangstas Making Astronomical Community Changes (G.M.A.C.C.), Sesame Flyers, and East Flatbush Village and leaders in the East Flatbush neighborhood of Brooklyn. The program is an evidence-based public health approach, which identifies and engages individuals most likely to be involved in gun violence and deploys interventions aimed at curbing that behavior before it occurs, including retaliatory shootings. The initiative combines six city agencies and organizations to work with violence interrupters and mediators as well as provide rap around community-based preventive services.  This month-long program for community members, ages 16–21, provides job skills training, resume help, and job placement assistance or college access assistance. OBT will also provide services for community members up to the age of 30, which will include job placement assistance.

Cloud Support Engineer and Digital Marketing program
OBT's  12-week Cloud Support Engineer and Digital Marketing program focuses on careers in the IT/Innovation sector. Students gain industry-specific soft and hard skills including Linux and Security fundamentals, networking concepts, relational databases, and cloud. Program graduates can also earn up to 15 credits for enrollment at CUNY School of Professional Studies. Upon successful completion the students receive certifications through Amazon Web Services, Google, and Facebook and are advised by a Tech Pathways Employment Specialist who connects them to tech-sector opportunities that range from internships to full time positions that pay 45-65k annually.

Masonry Restoration Technician Training
Masonry Restoration Technician Training is offered through a partnership with Green-Wood Cemetery, the World Monuments Fund, and the International Masonry Institute (IMI). The program combines education and pre-apprenticeship programming for hands-on training in construction trades, with graduates earning industry-certified credentials.

Customized Customer Service Trainings
Opportunities for a Better Tomorrow's Customized Customer Service Trainings (Bootcamp) are non-traditional ten-day intense trainings designed to equip job seekers with the tools needed to professionally soar in today's workforce, while meeting the vast employment needs of our Employer Partners. With a "Pledge to Success" by all stakeholders, OBT's Bootcamps include customized training contents and attached employment opportunities provided by our fully engaged employers.

Adult Employment and Training
The adult employment and training program is expected to provide over 3,000 adults per year with the training and assistance in obtaining a new or better-paying job. The services are open to people from all stages in their career, whether they are unemployed, underemployed, on public assistance, or a veteran. Recognizing that each jobseeker has individual needs, OBT's employment team tailors a unique service plan that may include business skills training, resume development, or job placement support. Out of the BWRC, OBT also offers classes to become a certified Microsoft Office Specialist.

Adult Literacy
OBT offers adults Basic Computer for English Language Learners, English for Speakers of other Languages (ESOL) and High School Equivalency (HSE) classes in our Bushwick and Coney Island locations. We also offer a preparatory course for US citizenship.

Our ESOL program is designed to help adults improve their English and computer literacy skills and obtain/improve employment. The target population are adult learners who are returning to the workplace, transferring careers, or seeking to advance in their job, as well as English language learners and basic education students with limited language and literacy skills. Our programs provide students with the opportunity to obtain a certification in Microsoft Suite with Northstart Digital Literacy.

The Adult Literacy Program offers free English for Speakers of Other Languages (ESOL) classes in the Bushwick, Bedford–Stuyvesant, and Sunset Park communities each year. OBT supports students with a range of services including training in employment skills, and job placement services. OBT also offers High School Equivalency and Pre-High School Equivalency classes to adults at its Bushwick and Sunset Park locations.
ESOL classes are offered for adults ages 19 and older, to improve their basic literacy skills in English. The four main areas of focus are Listening, Speaking, Reading, and Writing. Upon completion of our program, students experience improved oral English skills while enhancing their knowledge of community and health topics, workplace skills, vocabulary, and basic computer skills.

HSE classes are open to adults ages 19 and older in Bushwick, and 21 and older in Coney Island.  In addition to HSE, OBT students are enrolled in an Essential Education course which augments their in-class sessions and helps to develop self-studying skills.  Upon completion of our program, students are well prepared to excel in all five subjects of the GED exam (Reading, Writing, Math, Science, and Social Studies).

Office of New Americans
OBT's Office for New Americans located at the Bushwick Workforce Resource Center exists to provide New Yorkers with free services for the immigration applications such as Naturalization, Renewal of Green Card, Certificate of Citizenship, Deferred Action for Childhood Arrivals (DACA) and Deferred Action for Parental Accountability, as well as referrals to other no or low-cost immigration services throughout the city. ONA also offers entrepreneurship classes taught in Spanish.

Serving a large immigrant population, OBT is proud to offer a 3-hour weekly course to assist individuals in their preparation for the United States citizenship examination.  The course provides instruction on U.S. history, government, civics and incorporates a mock interview component to prepare for the citizenship interview.  We partner with legal resources in the community to provide our students with referrals for legal assistance as needed.

References

9. https://obtjobs.org/uncategorized/new-york-city-non-profit-opportunities-for-a-better-tomorrow-doubles-down-to-strengthen-workforce-in-the-post-pandemic-world/

Further reading
 "S&I 100 List" Social Impact Exchange
 "Job Training for Kids," Courier Life Publications
 "Paving the way for a better Tomorrow, OBT gives tall salute to outstanding trio of Executives in the community," Courier Life Publications 
 "Helping Create a Better Tomorrow," Courier Life Publications
 "Teens train for Tomorrowmany gain the skills needed for careers," Courier Life Publications. 
 "Sister Mary Franciscus Way Debuts," Courier Life Publications
 "Sister Mary Franciscus Way: Street Renaming in Sunset Park," Brooklyn Eagle.
"New Paths Of Opportunity For Immigrants in New York" Gotham Gazette.

External links
 

Non-profit organizations based in New York (state)